The 1995–96 NBA season was the Mavericks' 16th season in the National Basketball Association. The Mavericks got off to a fast start winning their first four games. However, after a 5–1 start to the season, they struggled losing 21 of their next 24 games, as Jamal Mashburn went down with a knee injury after playing just 18 games, averaging 23.4 points per game. Mashburn, second-year star Jason Kidd and Jim Jackson all had trouble getting along as teammates, as Mashburn and Jackson both feuded with each other, and Jackson and Kidd both feuded with each other; there were rumors that R&B singer Toni Braxton was involved in Kidd and Jackson's feud. The team's troubles continued as sixth man Roy Tarpley was banned from the NBA for violating the league's anti-drug policy. After holding a 16–30 record at the All-Star break, the Mavericks suffered an 11-game losing streak in March, and finished fifth in the Midwest Division with a 26–56 record.

Kidd averaged 16.6 points, 6.8 rebounds, 9.7 assists and 2.2 steals per game, as he was selected to play in the 1996 NBA All-Star Game, which was his first All-Star appearance. In addition, Jackson averaged 19.6 points and 5.0 rebounds per game, while George McCloud showed improvement, stepping up in Mashburn's absence, averaging 18.9 points, 4.8 rebounds and 1.4 steals per game, while finishing second in the league with 257 three-point field goals, and also finishing in second place in Most Improved Player voting. Popeye Jones provided the team with 11.3 points and 10.8 rebounds per game, while off the bench, second-year guard Tony Dumas contributed 11.6 points per game, Lucious Harris contributed 7.9 points per game, and starting center Lorenzo Williams averaged 8.0 rebounds and 1.9 blocks per game.

In May, Ross Perot, Jr. purchased the team from founder Don Carter. Following the season, Jones was traded to the Toronto Raptors, while Harris signed as a free agent with the Philadelphia 76ers, Williams signed with the Washington Bullets, Scott Brooks signed with the New York Knicks, Terry Davis was released to free agency, and Dick Motta was fired as head coach.

Offseason

Draft picks

Roster

Regular season

Season standings

z - clinched division title
y - clinched division title
x - clinched playoff spot

Record vs. opponents

Game log

Player statistics

Awards and records
 Jason Kidd, NBA All-Star Game

Transactions

References

See also
 1995-96 NBA season

Dallas Mavericks seasons
Dallas
Dallas
Dallas